David Ramsay (born 14 April 1957 in Edinburgh, Scotland) is a Scottish curler and curling coach.

At the national level, he is a two-time Scottish men's champion curler (1981, 1982) and a 1978 Scottish junior champion curler.

At the international level, he is a  bronze medallist.

Awards
 WJCC All-Star Team, Men:

Teams

Record as a coach of national teams

References

External links

 

1957 births
Living people
Curlers from Edinburgh
Scottish male curlers
Scottish curling champions
Scottish curling coaches